Raleigh Studios is a studio facility located in Hollywood, Los Angeles and has been under the ownership of Raleigh Enterprises since 1979. The location has been active since 1915. Before Raleigh, the studio was run by Famous Players Film Company, Clune Studios, California Studios, and others. Raleigh "has no identifiable brand or logo", serving as a rental space for numerous films both before Raleigh Enterprises ownership and afterward. Author Tom Ogden describes Raleigh Studios as "an independent studio, unaffiliated with any of the majors" which in 2009 had nine soundstages available. As of 2022, the location has 13 soundstages.

There are offshoots of Raleigh Studios such as Raleigh Studios Michigan in Pontiac, Michigan.

References

External links

Commercial buildings in Los Angeles
American film studios